Lluxita (Aymara lluxi shell of a mussel; landslide, -ta a suffix, also spelled Llojeta) is a mountain in the Bolivian Andes which reaches a height of approximately . It is located in the Potosí Department, Chayanta Province, Ocurí Municipality. It lies southeast of the village of Ch'aki Mayu (Chaqui Mayu).

References 

Mountains of Potosí Department